Fuyang West railway station is a high-speed railway station in Yingzhou District, Fuyang, Anhui. It was opened in December 2019. The station is an interchange between the Shangqiu–Hangzhou high-speed railway and the Zhengzhou–Fuyang high-speed railway.

The station is situated a few hundred metres away from Fuyang Xiguan Airport however no direct transfer exists.

See also 

 Fuyang railway station, main conventional railway station serving Fuyang

References

Transport in Anhui
Railway stations in Anhui
Railway stations in China opened in 2019